Yevgeni Viktorovich Ivanov (also transliterated as Yevgeny; born August 16, 1964) is a member of the State Duma of Russia, and a member of LDPR. He is deputy chairman of the State Duma's Committee on Budget Issues and Taxes.  He is a graduate in history of Kuban State University in Russia.

1964 births
Living people
Fourth convocation members of the State Duma (Russian Federation)
Liberal Democratic Party of Russia politicians